Kalle Olsson (born January 31, 1985) is a Swedish former professional ice hockey player. He most recently played for Örebro HK in the Swedish Hockey League (SHL). Olsson was selected by the Edmonton Oilers in the fifth round, 147th overall, of the 2003 NHL Entry Draft.

Olsson has previously played in the SHL with Frölunda HC and Linköpings HC.

Career statistics

Regular season and playoffs

International

References

External links

1985 births
Living people
Edmonton Oilers draft picks
Frölunda HC players
Linköping HC players
Swedish ice hockey forwards
Växjö Lakers players
VIK Västerås HK players
HC Vita Hästen players
Örebro HK players